Montarcher is a commune in the Loire department in central France.

Population

Surrounding towns
Ambert
La Chaise-Dieu
Saint-Étienne
Sainte-Croix-en-Jarez
Allègre
Olliergues
Lavaudieu
Courpière
Thiers

See also
Communes of the Loire department

References

Communes of Loire (department)